The town of Whangamatā is on the southeast coast of the Coromandel Peninsula in the North Island of New Zealand. It is located 30 kilometres north of Waihi, to the north of the western extremity of the Bay of Plenty.

In holiday times the population swells considerably: New Year's celebrations fill the town to over 25,000 though this falls soon after New Year's Day.

A number of off-shore islands can be seen from the beach. Hauturu or Clark Island is accessible by wading at low tide and is popular in summer months for rock-pool fossickers and kayakers. Whenuakura, sometimes known as Donut Island, sits about a kilometre east of the southern part of Whangamatā beach (Otahu Beach). Tuatara roamed on Whenuakura until fairly recently. Whenuakura Island has a large collapsed blow hole which has formed a small beach inside the island – hence the alternative name.

The town has two ocean beaches, both of which are extremely safe for swimming and surfing. There is a safe boating harbour at the North end of the town and another estuary at the South end. 15 minutes drive south of Whangamatā is the quietly popular beach Whiritoa. Other beaches just north of Whangamatā are Onemana and Opoutere.

Place name

The Māori name 'Whangamatā' comes from the words 'whanga', which means bay, and 'matā', which means a hard stone, in reference to the obsidian which washes up on the beach. Areas along the coast such as Onemana were locations where matā (chert) and matā tūhua (obsidian) were found and processed into stone tools.

Demographics

Whangamatā had a population of 4,074 at the 2018 New Zealand census, an increase of 558 people (15.9%) since the 2013 census, and an increase of 513 people (14.4%) since the 2006 census. There were 1,821 households, comprising 2,019 males and 2,058 females, giving a sex ratio of 0.98 males per female. The median age was 57.8 years (compared with 37.4 years nationally), with 561 people (13.8%) aged under 15 years, 396 (9.7%) aged 15 to 29, 1,593 (39.1%) aged 30 to 64, and 1,524 (37.4%) aged 65 or older.

Ethnicities were 91.4% European/Pākehā, 15.8% Māori, 1.9% Pacific peoples, 1.8% Asian, and 1.2% other ethnicities. People may identify with more than one ethnicity.

The percentage of people born overseas was 13.6, compared with 27.1% nationally.

Although some people chose not to answer the census's question about religious affiliation, 54.2% had no religion, 35.3% were Christian, 0.4% had Māori religious beliefs, 0.7% were Hindu, 0.1% were Muslim, 0.4% were Buddhist and 1.3% had other religions.

Of those at least 15 years old, 429 (12.2%) people had a bachelor's or higher degree, and 882 (25.1%) people had no formal qualifications. The median income was $24,900, compared with $31,800 nationally. 381 people (10.8%) earned over $70,000 compared to 17.2% nationally. The employment status of those at least 15 was that 1,134 (32.3%) people were employed full-time, 570 (16.2%) were part-time, and 78 (2.2%) were unemployed.

Rural area

Whangamatā Rural had a population of 432 at the 2018 New Zealand census, an increase of 75 people (21.0%) since the 2013 census, and an increase of 30 people (7.5%) since the 2006 census. There were 174 households, comprising 213 males and 216 females, giving a sex ratio of 0.99 males per female. The median age was 56.2 years (compared with 37.4 years nationally), with 66 people (15.3%) aged under 15 years, 39 (9.0%) aged 15 to 29, 195 (45.1%) aged 30 to 64, and 129 (29.9%) aged 65 or older.

Ethnicities were 86.1% European/Pākehā, 22.2% Māori, 1.4% Pacific peoples, 1.4% Asian, and 2.8% other ethnicities. People may identify with more than one ethnicity.

The percentage of people born overseas was 18.1, compared with 27.1% nationally.

Although some people chose not to answer the census's question about religious affiliation, 59.0% had no religion, 31.2% were Christian, 0.7% had Māori religious beliefs, 0.7% were Buddhist and 0.7% had other religions.

Of those at least 15 years old, 69 (18.9%) people had a bachelor's or higher degree, and 72 (19.7%) people had no formal qualifications. The median income was $29,200, compared with $31,800 nationally. 42 people (11.5%) earned over $70,000 compared to 17.2% nationally. The employment status of those at least 15 was that 138 (37.7%) people were employed full-time, 72 (19.7%) were part-time, and 9 (2.5%) were unemployed.

Education
Whangamata Area School is a coeducational composite school (years 1–13) with a roll of  students as of

Marina

A controversial marina has been constructed on the Whangamatā estuary. The Whangamatā estuary is the shallowest on the North Island, with approximately 75% of the estuary’s water volume leaving on the low tide. The new marina basin at low tide is below sea level. Since the consent was granted, many new, and non-notified consents have been granted, including that the boat channel no longer has to be rock walled, meaning that a great deal more marine material is to be permanently removed from the estuary's sedimentary cycle.  Surfers, environmentalists and Māori have opposed the marina due to the effects upon a major wetland area and the risk to a world-class left hand surf break. An Environment Court hearing stipulated that the marina could go ahead as long as certain conditions were met. Chris Carter, a former Minister of Conservation, blocked the development but his decision was judicially reviewed by the marina developers.

The decision was sent back to Conservation Minister Chris Carter, who stated that in the interests of transparency he would then give the final decision to Environment Minister David Benson-Pope, who allowed the marina to go ahead provided that strict conditions were met regarding containment of dredged materials during construction and monitoring of the world-famous surf break at the estuary's entrance. Several rare species were displaced or exterminated for the development, including the rare Oligosoma moco skink. The marina opened in November 2009.

In May 2012 a meeting of local surfers and Coastal processes scientists concluded that the Whangamatā Bar had degraded for the sport of surfing, soon after the Surfbreak Protection Society released a Report citing that the Bar monitoring plan enlisted by the council was not capable of detecting changes to the Whangamatā Bar, because Maintenance dredging events were not correlated with The Bar monitoring surveys.

Even so, the surveys were showing a degraded surfing quality on the Bar.
The Whangamatā Bar is Protected under the New Zealand Coastal Policy Statement 2010, yet to date the Local Authority, Waikato Regional Council (WRC) state that there is not enough science to prove that the degradation is caused by the marina or some other natural phenomena.
 
However, while WRC acknowledges that the Whangamatā Bar has degraded, WRC appear unwilling to enforce the Marina developers to conduct the appropriate science to ascertain the cause.

The Environmental Defence Society has offered to host a workshop (without prejudice) to find positive outcomes. To date, the Waikato regional Council have not taken up this offer, which may mean that further court action could follow.

See also
Whangamata Beach Hop

References

External links

 Whangamata Area School
  Whangamata Surf Lifesaving Club Inc.

Thames-Coromandel District
Populated places in Waikato
Surfing locations in New Zealand
Beaches of Waikato